Guy III Trousseau (died 1109) was lord of Montlhéry, and the son of Milo I of Montlhéry and Lithuise.

Guy had the temperament of a warrior, and went on the First Crusade in 1096. He was one of those who deserted the army during the Siege of Antioch, and did not dare return directly to France, instead returning home by a long detour through Epirus and Italy.   

Guy had only one child:
 Elizabeth of Montlhéry, married Philip, Count of Mantes, son of Philip I of France and Bertrada de Montfort.

References

Sources

Christians of the First Crusade

1109 deaths
Year of birth unknown